The Chimney Peak Wilderness is a   wilderness area located  northwest of Ridgecrest, in southeastern Tulare County, California.

The 1994 California Desert Protection Act (Public Law 103–433) created the wilderness and it is managed by the Bureau of Land Management (BLM), Department of the Interior.

The Chimney Peak Wilderness is a rugged and mountainous Mojave Desert environment on the eastern side of the Southern Sierra Nevada Range. The wilderness is named for Chimney Peak, elevation , located in the northeast corner of the wilderness.

The area has Mojave Desert plants such as Joshua tree (Yucca brevifolia) and creosote bush (Larrea tridentata) on the valley floors and alluvial fans and in the Sierra foothills. Higher Sierra elevations have single-leaf pinyon pine (Pinus monophylla).

Recreation
Recreational activities include  hiking, horseback riding, fishing and camping/backpacking. No motorized vehicles or mechanical equipment is allowed within a wilderness area. A backcountry byway for vehicles is adjacent to part of it.

The Pacific Crest Trail passes through the wilderness area.

A portion of the Sacatar Trail, an old wagon road into the Owens Valley once used by soldiers and cattlemen, cross the Chimney Peak Wilderness, .

Chimney Peak Backcountry Byway
The BLM began a "byway" program in 1989 which is a tour by automobile through or near scenic public lands. This program designates "backcountry byways" along secondary roads.

See also
Sacatar Trail Wilderness — adjacent.

Notes

External links
 
 

Wilderness areas of California
Protected areas of the Mojave Desert
Protected areas of the Sierra Nevada (United States)
Protected areas of Tulare County, California
Bureau of Land Management areas in California
Protected areas established in 1994
1994 establishments in California